New Sunrise is the fifth studio album by Japanese electronicore band Fear, and Loathing in Las Vegas. It was released on 25 October 2017 through Warner Music Japan. It is the first release on this label since the band's departure from VAP. It also the last album to feature founding lead guitarist Sxun, who left the band due to personal circumstances. It is also the last one to feature their second bassist Kei, who died due to an acute heart failure at his home on midnight of 12 January.

Background and promotion
In 2017, the band signed onto a new label with Warner Music Japan. On 2 April 2017, the band announced on their official site the trailer for their new single, "Shine" on 23 June. On 26 May, they released a trailer for a PV for the song "Shine" with the full version being released the following month. The second single "Return to Zero" was released on 11 July. On 11 October, an PV was released for their new song "LLLD" which is featured on the album. On 23 October, they released another new PV titled "The Sun Also Rises" which is the final track of the album.

Track listing

Personnel
Fear, and Loathing in Las Vegas
 So – clean vocals, backing unclean vocals, programming
 Minami – unclean vocals, rapping, keyboards, programming
 Sxun – lead guitar, backing vocals
 Taiki – rhythm guitar, backing vocals
 Kei – bass
 Tomonori – drums, percussion

Charts

Album

Singles

Certifications

References

Fear, and Loathing in Las Vegas (band) albums
2017 albums